Phytoecia wachanrui is a species of beetle in the family Cerambycidae. It was described by Étienne Mulsant in 1851. It is known from Jordan, Syria, Lebanon, Iran, and Turkey.

References

Phytoecia
Beetles described in 1851